is a railway station on the Chitose Line located in Kitahiroshima, Hokkaidō, Japan.

Railway stations in Hokkaido Prefecture
Railway stations in Japan opened in 1926